The Pippet Family are a family of designers and artists based in Warwickshire and Birmingham, who specialised in Catholic decorative schemes for churches, ecclesiastical metalwork and stained glass windows as well as some textile items. They were part of the British Gothic Revival, notably working for John Hardman & Co in the style of Pugin.

Joseph Aloysius Pippet 

Born in Somerset in 1840 he was briefly educated at Downside Catholic school until his family moved to Leamington after his father was appointed land agent to the Throckmortons. His father was a notable convert to Catholicism, which is mentioned in his obituary.  Joseph was apprenticed at John Hardman and Co sometime in 1853, becoming a reliable designer and design practice co-ordinator. He designed the interior decoration for Pugin's All Saints' Church in Barton-upon-Irwell, Lancashire, as well as wall paintings as for Shrewsbury Roman Catholic Cathedral, the latter of which had become hidden in twentieth century refurbishing but revealed in restoration work since 2019. He worked particularly closely with Pugin's apprentice and son-in-law J.H. Powell. In the 1860's he decorated St Peter's church, Hascombe. Other examples of his work are in: Holy Trinity Church, Winchester; Salford Cathedral; Church of the Sacred Heart, Caterham, Surrey.

He married Juliet Elizabeth Mary Canning of Handsworth, Birmingham in 1865 and they had sixteen children. Juliet managed her husband's accounts, writing letters concerning wages and more personal problems to J.H. Powell of Hardman and Co on behalf of Joseph. She was also an exceptional embroiderer, as were two of her daughters. Out of seven daughters four became nuns, one of whom went on to become the Abbess at Teignmouth. He died in September 1903 at his house in Solihull from pneumonia. There was a solemn requiem held at St. Augustine's Church, Solihull, the family church with many artistic contributions by his family; his funeral took place at Baddesley Clinton.

Elphege and Oswald Pippet 

Elphege Joseph, born 1868, and Oswald Cody, 1869, and to a lesser extent their younger brother Wilfred, 1873, all worked for Hardman and Co. Later, Elphege and Oswald became independent subcontractors and designed many buildings for the company well into the 1930s.

Some of their designs include:

 Chancel Decoration, Church of Our Lady, Ilkeston
 Chapel Painting, St Anthony's Convent, Hull
 Decoration of the Sacred Heart Chapel, St Mary's, Chorley
 Decoration, Church of the Annunciation, Chesterfield
 Shrine Chapel Decoration, York Oratory
 Chapel Decoration, St Gregory's Convent, Cheltenham
 Lady Chapel Decoration, St Catherine's, Birmingham
 Decoration of Seminary Lady Chapel, St Cuthbert's College, Ushaw
 English Martyrs' Chapel, Nottingham Cathedral
 Interior Decorations of Sacred Heart Chapel, Sanctuary and Holy Family Chapel, Nazareth House, Hammersmith
 Decoration of Oratory, Convent of the Sisters, Bristol
 Sanctuary Decoration, St Joseph's, Richmond
 High Altar, St Wilfrid's, Cotton
 Sanctuary Ceiling, St Scholastica's Abbey, Teignmouth
 Blessed Sacrament Chapel, St Barnabas' Cathedral, Nottingham

Gabriel Pippet 

Born 1880, Gabriel Joseph Pippet became a renowned designer of mosaic and opus sectile. His finest work can be seen at the Church of the Sacred Heart, Droitwich. He also designed a set of Stations of the Cross for Corpus Christi Church, Baltimore, USA between 1896 and 1914. He taught art at Achimoto College, Gold Coast (now Ghana).

References

 Bill Covington, 'J. A. Pippet and Hardman, Powell & Company', True Principles, vol. 2 No. 3, 2001
 Brian Doolan, 'The Pugins and the Hardmans', 2004
 Michael Fisher, 'Pugin Land', 2002

Gothic Revival architecture
People from Solihull
19th-century British artists
19th-century English painters
English male painters
Religious artists
19th-century English male artists